Thunbergia is a genus of flowering plants in the family Acanthaceae, native to tropical regions of Africa, Madagascar and southern Asia. Thunbergia species are vigorous annual or perennial vines and shrubs growing to 2–8 m tall. The generic name honours the Swedish naturalist Carl Peter Thunberg (1743-1828).

Its members are known by various names, including thunbergias and clockvine. Thunbergia on its own usually refers to Thunbergia grandiflora, while Thunbergia alata is often known as black-eyed Susan vine or just black-eyed Susan (not to be confused with other flowers called black-eyed Susan). Orange clockvine is the name of Thunbergia gregorii.

Thunbergias are frequent garden escapes, becoming invasive species; T. grandiflora, T. fragrans, and T. laurifolia are considered weeds in Australia.

Selected species

Thunbergia alata Bojer ex Sims
Thunbergia annua Hochst. ex Nees
Thunbergia atriplicifolia  E.Mey. ex Nees 
Thunbergia battiscombei Turrill
Thunbergia coccinea Wall. ex D.Don
Thunbergia cordata Colla
Thunbergia elegans Borzí
Thunbergia erecta (Benth.) T. Anderson
Thunbergia fragrans Roxb.
Thunbergia gibsonii S. Moore
Thunbergia grandiflora Roxb.
Thunbergia gregorii S.Moore
Thunbergia ikbaliana De Wild.
Thunbergia laurifolia Lindl.
Thunbergia lutea T. Anderson
Thunbergia mysorensis (Wight) T.Anderson
Thunbergia natalensis Hook.
Thunbergia vogeliana Benth.
Thunbergia wightiana T.Anderson

Formerly placed here
Meyenia hawtayneana (Wall.) Nees (as T. hawtayneana Wall.)

Gallery

References

External links

A Tale of Two Susans II - non-scholarly essay on the etymology and history of Thunbergia (and Carl Peter Thunberg)

 
Acanthaceae genera